A list of films produced in Kazakhstan many of which are produced in the Kazakh language.

Non-alphabetical
1997 - Zapisi Rustema s risunkami (1998)

A
Abai (1995) 
Aksuat (1999)
Alciz Shurek (1994)
Allazhar (1993) 
Altyn Kyrghol (2001) 
Amanat (2016)
Amangel'dy (1938)
Amerikanskaya doch (1995)
Antiromantika (2001)
Ayka (2018)

B
Batyr-bayan (1993) 
Burnaja reka, bezmiateznoje more (2004)

C
The Crying Steppe (2020)

D
Desant (1988) 
Dikiy vostok (1993) 
Dzhosus/Lazutchik (1992) 
Dzhuliya (1992)

E 
Eisenstein v Alma-Ate (1998)
Ergii (2001) 
Experimentum crucis (1995)

F
Fara (1999)
The First Rains of Spring (2011)

G
The Gentle Indifference of the World (2018)
Gibel Otrara (1991) 
Golubinyj zvonar (1994)
Gorkiy dym oseni (1997)
Gospodi, pomiluy zabludshikh (1992)

H 
Harmony Lessons (2013)
Highway (1999)
Hundeleben (2004)

J
Jol (2001) 
Jylama (2003)

K
Kairat (1992)  
Kardiogramma  
Kiyan (Konechnaya ostanovka)(1989)
Killer (1998 film)
Kyz-Zhibek (1970)

M
Malenkie lyudi (2003) 
Molitva Leyly (2002) 
Mongol (2007)
Myn Bala (2011)

N
Namis (1996)
Nomad (2006 film)

O
Okhotnik (2004) 
Ompa (1998) 
Ostrov vozrozhdeniya (2004) 
Ovsunchu (2003)
The Owners (2014)

P
The Plague at the Karatas Village (2016)
Posledniye kanikuly (1996)
Posledniye kholoda (1993) 
Prisoner of the Mountains (1996)

R
Returning to the 'A' (2011)

S
Sagan kushik kerek pe? (2004)
Schastye (1996) 
Shiza (2004) 
Smacznego, telewizorku (1993) 
Songs from the Southern Seas (2008) 
Sorcerer's Dolls (1998) 
Steppe Express (2005) 
Stranger (1993)
Stranger (2015)
Sunny Days (2011)

T
Tot, kto nezhneye (1995)
Tri brata (2000)
Tomiris (2019)
Tulpan (2008)

U 
 Ulzhan (2007)

V
Vokaldy paralelder (2005)

W
Walnut Tree (2015)
The Wounded Angel (2016)

Y
Yellow Cat (2020)

Z
Zhizneopisaniye molodogo akkordeonista (1994) 
Zhyoshya (2006)

References

External links
 Kazakhstani film at the Internet Movie Database

Kazakhstan

Films